Mohammad Selim (1940 – 20 January 2015) was a Bangladesh Awami League politician and a former Jatiya Sangsad member from Sirajganj-1 constituency.

Early life and family
Selim was born in 1940 to a Bengali Muslim family of Sarkars hailing from Kuripara in Qazipur, Sirajganj (then under Pabna District), Bengal Presidency. Selim's father was Captain M Mansur Ali, a key figure of Bangladeshi independence and a former Prime Minister of Bangladesh. His brother is the former Health Minister Mohammed Nasim.

Career
Selim was elected to Parliament in 1996 from Sirajganj-1 as a Bangladesh Awami League candidate. He was an advisory and presidium member of Bangladesh Awami League.

References

1940s births
2015 deaths
Awami League politicians
7th Jatiya Sangsad members
21st-century Bengalis
20th-century Bengalis
People from Sirajganj District